Events in the year 1991 in the Netherlands.

Incumbents
 Monarch: Beatrix
 Prime Minister: Ruud Lubbers

Events
14 February – Culemborg fireworks disaster
16 to 20 July – The 1991 European Women's Cricket Championship was held in Haarlem

Births

5 January – Anne Terpstra, cross-country cyclist
24 January – Jett Rebel, singer-songwriter, composer, multi-instrumentalist and recording artist
29 January – Rachel de Haze, handball player.
31 January – Nicole Koolhaas, volleyball player 
13 February – Glenn Coldenhoff, motocross racer
23 February – Chatilla van Grinsven, basketball player 
16 March – Catharina van der Sloot, water polo player
12 April – Rozanne Slik, racing cyclist.
14 April – Melisa Aslı Pamuk, beauty pageant titleholder, actress and model
5 May – Robin de Kruijf, volleyball player
7 May – Wouter ter Maat, volleyball player
13 June – Ricardo van Rhijn, footballer
28 July – Isabelle Jongenelen, handball player.
5 August – Daniëlle van de Donk, footballer
21 August Tess Gaerthé, singer
27 August – Robbert de Greef, cyclist (d. 2019).
8 September – Luis Tavares, kickboxer
19 September – Michael Kok, basketball player
8 October – Bakermat, DJ and music producer
13 November – Jeffrey Bruma, footballer
20 November – Jeanine Stoeten, volleyball player
24 November - Ted Heijckmann, footballer
19 December – Steven Berghuis, footballer
25 December – Gaite Jansen, actress

Full date missing
Mano Bouzamour, novelist and columnist

Deaths
24 March – Adrie Zwartepoorte, cyclist (b. 1917).
5 June – Frederik Belinfante, physicist (b. 1913)
27 June – Klaas Bruinsma, drug lord (b. 1953)
1 July – Joost Baljeu, painter, sculptor and writer (b. 1925)
5 September – Peter Slaghuis, DJ and music producer (b. 1961)
11 September – Jan van Gemert, painter, graphic artist, sculptor, glass artist and ceramist (b. 1921)
22 September – Fons Steuten, cyclist (b. 1938).

Full date missing
Jan Kagie, painter (b. 1907)

References

 
1990s in the Netherlands
Years of the 20th century in the Netherlands
Netherlands
Netherlands